StW 505 is the most complete hominin cranium discovered in Sterkfontein Member 4 since Broom's excavations. It was found in situ in Member 4 breccia in 1989 and is larger, on the whole, than any other cranium from Sterkfontein that has comparable parts.

Displacement due to breakage, as well as plastic deformation, has affected Stw 505 in several areas, especially the face and the vault. Diagnosticmorphology is nevertheless abundant in the specimen. In several areas-the distinct anterior pillar, the straight inferior border of the zygoma, the pattern of cresting on the naso-alveolar clivus, the basal aspect of the temporal bone-Stw 505 closely matches the morphology of specimens of Australopithecus africanus and is distinct from other hominins. Some isolated characters overlap with other groups, mainly early Homo and/or A. robustus. However, only the hypodigm of A. africanus can accommodate the entire suite of morphology. In some cases, Stw 505 introduces more variation into the Sterkfontein sample. For example, prominent superciliary eminences occupy the medial portions of the supraorbital region and flow medially into a strongly protruding glabellar mound. These characteristics are probably attributable to sexual dimorphism. In many respects, Stw 505 highlights similarities between A. africanus and early Homo. Comparison with other species suggests that males of A. africanus do not show derived features of A. robustus that are not also present in females, and that cranial differences between A. afarensis and A. africanus have, if anything, been understated.

See also 
 List of human evolution fossils
 STS 14

References

Bibliography

External links 

Australopithecus fossils
Archaeological discoveries in South Africa
1989 archaeological discoveries
Archaeology of Southern Africa